A feast or banquet is a large meal.

Feast may also refer to:

Events or meals
 Feast day, commemorating a certain saint or blessed
 Feast Festival, Adelaide's annual LGBT festival
 Festival, an event ordinarily celebrated by a community and centering on some characteristic aspect of that community
 Nineteen Day Feast, a monthly meeting held in Bahá'í communities to worship, consult, and socialize

People
 Michael William Feast, astronomer

Art, entertainment, and media

Films
 Feast (2005 film), an American horror comedy film 
 Feast (2014 film), an American animated short film
 Feast (2021 film), a Dutch film
 The Feast, a 2021 Welsh film

Music
 Feast (The Creatures album), 1983
 Feast (Annihilator album), 2013
 .Feast, a stoner rock band from Indonesia

Other uses
 Families Empowered and Supporting Treatment of Eating Disorders (F.E.A.S.T.)
 FEAST test, used to assess candidates for training as Air Traffic Controllers in Europe
 Feast Ice Cream, a popular chocolate ice cream.